Piffaro may refer to:
 Piffero, a double reed musical instrument with a conical bore
Piffaro, The Renaissance Band, an early music ensemble in Philadelphia